Arlandus Jacob Bouye (born August 16, 1991) is an American football cornerback who is a free agent. He played college football at UCF, and was signed by the Houston Texans as an undrafted free agent in 2013. Bouye has also played for the Jacksonville Jaguars, Denver Broncos and Carolina Panthers.

Early years
Bouye attended and played high school football at Tucker High School.

College career
Bouye played college football at UCF from 2009 to 2012 under head coach George O'Leary. As a freshman, he had 10 total tackles and one pass defensed in six games. He saw an expanded role in his sophomore season. In ten games, he had 26 total tackles, one interception return for a touchdown (a 42-yarder against Marshall), and eight passes defended. As a junior, he appeared in seven games and had 21 total tackles, two interceptions, and five passes defensed. In his final season with the Knights in 2012, he had 53 total tackles, three interceptions, 11 passes defensed, one fumble recovery, and one forced fumble. In that stretch was a 32-yard pick-six and 79-yard fumble recovery touchdown against Memphis and a 76-yard pick-six against Tulsa. After his career with the Knights, Bouye entered the 2013 NFL Draft.

Collegiate statistics

Professional career

Houston Texans
On April 28, 2013, the Houston Texans signed Bouye to a three-year, $1.41 million contract that includes a $5,000 signing bonus after he went undrafted in the 2013 NFL Draft.

2013 season
Throughout organized team activities and training camp, Bouye competed for a roster spot and a job as the fourth cornerback against Brandon Harris, Roc Carmichael, Johnny Adams, and Travis Howard. Head coach Gary Kubiak named Bouye the fifth cornerback on the Texans' depth chart to start the regular season, behind Johnathan Joseph, Kareem Jackson, Brice McCain, and Brandon Harris.

He made his professional regular season debut in the Houston Texans' season-opening 31–28 victory at the San Diego Chargers. On September 28, 2013, Bouye made his first career tackle on fullback Derrick Coleman during a kick return in the second quarter of a 23–20 loss to the Seattle Seahawks. On October 16, 2013, the Houston Texans placed Bouye on injured reserve for the remainder of the season due to a strained hamstring. On December 13, 2013, Houston Texans' owner Bob McNair announced the firing of head coach Gary Kubiak after a franchise record 11th consecutive loss and a 2–11 record overall. Defensive coordinator Wade Phillips was named the interim coach for the last three games of the season.

2014 season
During training camp, secondary coach John Butler held an open competition for the job as the third cornerback on the depth chart. The competition included Bouye, Brandon Harris, Josh Victorian, Elbert Mack, Andre Hal, and Marcus Williams. Head coach Bill O'Brien named Bouye the third cornerback to start the regular season behind starters Johnathan Joseph and Kareem Jackson.

On September 21, 2014, Bouye earned his first career start and recorded three combined tackles in their 30–17 loss at the New York Giants in Week 3, but left in the third quarter after sustaining a groin injury. The injury sidelined him for the next two games (Weeks 4–5). In Week 9, Bouye recorded seven combined tackles, broke up a pass, and returned his first career interception, off a pass by quarterback Mark Sanchez, for a 51-yard touchdown in the Texans'  31–21 loss to the Philadelphia Eagles. It also marked Bouye's first career touchdown. On November 16, 2014, he collected a season-high ten combined tackles (nine solo) and a pass deflection during a 23–7 win at the Cleveland Browns. In Week 13, Bouye made three solo tackles, a pass deflection, and returned an interception by Jake Locker for a season-long 67-yard gain during the third quarter of a 45–21 victory against the Tennessee Titans. He finished the  season with 59 combined tackles (52 solo), ten pass deflections, three interceptions, a touchdown, a forced fumble, and a fumble recovery in 14 games and six starts. His three interceptions tied for the most among the Texans' defense in 2014.

2015 season
Throughout training camp, Bouye competed against rookie first round pick Kevin Johnson for the role as the third cornerback on the Texans' depth chart. Defensive coordinator Romeo Crennel opted to name Bouye the fourth cornerback on the depth chart to start the regular season, behind Johnathan Joseph, Kareem Jackson, and Kevin Johnson.

On October 18, 2015, Bouye recorded a season-high seven solo tackles, deflected two passes, and intercepted a pass by quarterback Blake Bortles during a 31–20 victory at the Jacksonville Jaguars. In Week 11, he deflected a pass before leaving the Texans' 24–17 victory against the New York Jets in the third quarter due to a concussion. He remained in concussion protocol and was inactive for their Week 12 victory against the New Orleans Saints. Bouye finished the  season with 16 combined tackles (15 solo), six pass deflections, and two interceptions in 15 games and two starts.

The Houston Texans finished first in the AFC South with a 9–7 record and received a Wild Card berth. On January 9, 2016, Bouye appeared in his first career playoff game and recorded a solo tackle in their 30–0 loss to the Kansas City Chiefs in the Wild Card Round.

2016 season
On March 8, 2016, the Houston Texans signed Bouye to a one-year, $1.67 million tender with a right of first refusal class after he became a restricted free agent in 2016.

He entered training camp slated as the fourth cornerback on the depth chart and opted to change his jersey number from No. 34 to his college number at Central Florida, No. 21. He stated he originally chose 21 because he was a fan of Deion Sanders growing up. As a rookie, he was unable to receive No. 21 as it belonged to longtime veteran Brice McCain. Head coach Bill O'Brien stated Bouye was one of the most improved players on defense during training camp.

He appeared in the Houston Texans' season-opener against the Chicago Bears and recorded three solo tackles, deflected a pass, and his first career sack on quarterback Jay Cutler during their 23–14 victory. Bouye became the Texans' third cornerback on the depth chart after Kevin Johnson broke his foot the previous week and was sidelined for the remainder of the season. On October 24, 2016, Bouye started at nickelback and recorded a season-high 11 combined tackles (nine solo) and two pass deflections in the Texans' 27–9 loss at the Denver Broncos. He was inactive for the Texans' Week 10 victory at the Jacksonville Jaguars after sustaining an ankle injury in practice two days prior. After an MRI, it was determined he only sustained a sprained ankle and returned the following week. In Week 11, Bouye recorded two combined tackles, broke up a pass, and intercepted a pass by Derek Carr during a 27–20 loss at the Oakland Raiders. Bouye had a breakout season in 2016 and finished with a career-high 63 combined tackles (48 solo), 16 pass deflections, an interception, and a sack in 15 games and 11 starts. Bouye earned the third highest grade among all cornerbacks in 2016 from Pro Football Focus.

The Houston Texans finished atop the AFC South with a 9–7 record and clinched a playoff berth. On January 7, 2017, Bouye started his first career playoff game and recorded two combined tackles, four pass deflections, and intercepted a pass attempt by Connor Cook in the Texans' 27–14 victory against the Oakland Raiders in the Wild Card Round. The following week, he made five solo tackles, deflected two passes, and intercepted a pass by Tom Brady during a 34–16 loss to the eventual Super Bowl LI Champions the New England Patriots in the Divisional Round.

Bouye became an unrestricted free agent after the 2016 season and was one of the most highly sought after free agents on the market. He was pursued by many teams, including the Chicago Bears, Jacksonville Jaguars, Tennessee Titans, San Francisco 49ers, Cleveland Browns, Indianapolis Colts, and Philadelphia Eagles.

Jacksonville Jaguars
On March 9, 2017, the Jacksonville Jaguars signed Bouye to a five-year, $67.5 million contract with $26 million guaranteed and a signing bonus of $10 million, making him the highest paid undrafted cornerback. Bouye stated he turned down a larger contract offer by the Chicago Bears to join the Jaguars.

2017 season
Head coach Doug Marrone named Bouye the starting cornerback along with Jalen Ramsey entering training camp. Bouye made his Jaguars' regular-season debut in their season-opener at the Houston Texans and recorded six combined tackles and two pass deflections during their 29–7 victory. On November 12, 2017, Bouye recorded four combined tackles, broke up a pass, and returned an interception 51-yards to set up Josh Lambo's 30-yard field goal to defeat the Los Angeles Chargers in overtime by a score of 20–17. He earned AFC Defensive Player of the Week honors for his performance. On December 3, 2017, he collected a season-high seven combined tackles during a 30–10 win against the Indianapolis Colts. In Week 14, Bouye recorded two combined tackles, a season-high four pass deflections, and intercepted two passes by quarterback Russell Wilson in a 30–24 win against the Seattle Seahawks. It marked Bouye's first multi-interception game of his career. On December 19, 2017, Bouye was named to his first Pro Bowl as a starter alongside teammate Ramsey. He finished the season with 56 combined tackles (53 solo), a career-high 18 pass deflections, and a career-high six interceptions in 16 games and 16 starts. Pro Football Focus gave Bouye an overall grade of 88.0, ranking him 12th among all cornerbacks in 2017. He was ranked 35th on the NFL Top 100 Players of 2018.

The Jaguars finished first in the AFC South with a 10–6 record. The Jaguars defeated the Buffalo Bills 10–3 in the Wild Card Round and defeated the Pittsburgh Steelers 45–42 in the AFC Divisional Round. On January 21, 2018, Bouye recorded six solo tackles during a 24–20 loss at the New England Patriots in the AFC Championship.

2018 season
In the 2018 season, Bouye started in 13 games and totaled 54 total tackles, one interception, and eight passes defensed as the Jaguars finished with a 5–11 record.

2019 season
In Week 8 against the New York Jets, Bouye recorded his first interception of the season off Sam Darnold in the 29–15 win. He played in 14 games and recorded 65 total tackles, one interception, and eight passes defensed in the 2019 season.

Denver Broncos
On March 3, 2020, the Jaguars agreed to trade Bouye to the Denver Broncos for a 2020 fourth-round pick originally acquired from the San Francisco 49ers. The deal became official on March 18. He suffered a dislocated shoulder in Week 1 and was placed on injured reserve on September 16, 2020. He was activated on October 24. He played in seven games, starting in all of them and recorded six passes defensed and no interceptions for the first time since his rookie season. On December 9, Bouye was suspended by the NFL for the next six games for violating the league's policy on performance-enhancing drugs. He missed the final four games of the season. Bouye was released on February 10, 2021, to clear cap space for the upcoming free agency period.

Carolina Panthers
Bouye signed with the Carolina Panthers on April 12, 2021. He entered the 2021 season as a starting cornerback for the Panthers. He suffered a foot injury in Week 14 and was placed on injured reserve on December 21. He finished the season with 28 tackles, three passes defensed, and a forced fumble through 10 games and seven starts.

On March 14, 2022, Bouye was released by the Panthers.

NFL career statistics

Personal life
When Bouye was only three years old, his mother, Jackie Baskin, died from breast and brain cancer. She was diagnosed with breast cancer and died nine months later after the cancer spread to her brain. She left Bouye and his older sister, Erin Baskin-Bradshaw. He was raised by his father, Steve Bouye, who promised his mother to always look after their son while she was on her deathbed. His father worked as a corrections officer for multiple facilities, including the United States Penitentiary in Atlanta. Bouye is a member of the American Cancer Society's Athlete Council and also participates in the Crucial Catch Challenge. Bouye is also a cousin of Boston Celtics shooting guard Jaylen Brown who was the 3rd overall pick in the 2016 NBA draft and a 2021 NBA All-Star. Bouye is married.

References

External links

 UCF Knights bio

Living people
1991 births
Players of American football from Georgia (U.S. state)
People from Tucker, Georgia
Sportspeople from DeKalb County, Georgia
American football cornerbacks
UCF Knights football players
Denver Broncos players
Houston Texans players
Jacksonville Jaguars players
American Conference Pro Bowl players
Carolina Panthers players